Claudio Nolano (born 22 September 1975) is an Italian taekwondo practitioner. He competed in the men's 68 kg event at the 2000 Summer Olympics.

References

1975 births
Living people
Italian male taekwondo practitioners
Olympic taekwondo practitioners of Italy
Taekwondo practitioners at the 2000 Summer Olympics
Sportspeople from Rome